Dynasty of Death was the debut novel of the Anglo-American writer Taylor Caldwell (1900–1985). When Caldwell submitted the manuscript to Maxwell Perkins in 1937, she was an unknown housewife from Buffalo, New York. Dynasty of Death launched her prolific career.

Background 
The novel is set in Windsor, Pennsylvania, a fictional mill town on the Allegheny River north of Pittsburgh.

It is an epic multigenerational saga, stretching from 1837 to the eve of World War I, about the Bouchard and Barbour families, who grow their small munitions factory into a great international corporation.

Joseph Barbour is a servant who becomes a successful businessman and arms manufacturer. His younger son Martin is not interested in money and is an idealist and altruist. Elder son Ernest is an egoist who believes that money is the greatest power in the world. Ernest loves Amy Drumhill, the niece of Gregory Sessions, owner of a steel factory. Amy marries Martin, however, who establishes a hospital and dies in the American Civil War. Ernest's hardness ruins Joseph, and he is cursed by his mother.

This story of the Bouchard clan is continued through World War II in Caldwell's later novels The Eagles Gather (1940) and The Final Hour (1944), although the Pittsburgh setting is largely left behind as the family takes its place on the world stage.

References

1938 American novels
Novels by Taylor Caldwell
Novels set in Pennsylvania
Family saga novels
1938 debut novels
Charles Scribner's Sons books